The European route E 313 is a road in Europe and a part of the United Nations International E-road network. It runs thus entirely within Belgium:  however, it does cross the language frontier within Belgium between the Dutch speaking Flanders and the French speaking Wallonia which affects the roadside route signs and safety-message posters. From the junction at Ranst where it splits from the E 34, it follows the Belgian A13.   

It also serves the same industrial belt as the Albert Canal, the route of which generally runs close to the E 313.   For much of the western end of the road the width of the strip of land between the road and the waterway is too narrow for residential use, and the land has instead been put to good use for industrial developments, notably in the area of Herentals.   The other major city served by the E 313 is Hasselt, the capital of the Belgian province of Limburg.

Characterised at the end of the 20th century by its poor surface, much of the road was renovated at the start of the 21st century.  The E 313 is an autoroute quality road, though east of the split with the E 34 it still has only two lanes in each direction.

The route

External links 
 UN Economic Commission for Europe: Overall Map of E-road Network (2007)

399313
E313